Viness Pillay FAAS (1970–2020) was a South African professor of pharmacy at the University of the Witwatersrand in Johannesburg. He was the Director of the Wits Advanced Drug Delivery Platform (WADDP), a member of African Academy of Sciences, Academy of Translational Medicine Professionals (ATMP) and a beneficiary of the 2013 Olusegun Obasanjo Innovative Award for developing the RapiDiss Wafer Technology as an innovative way to provide effective anti-retroviral (ARV) drug therapy to children afflicted with HIV/AIDS.

Education 
He obtained his Master's degree in pharmacy from the University of Durban-Westville (South Africa) in 1996 and bagged his PhD in Temple University in 2000 as a Fulbright Scholar.

Research areas 
Viness focused on Novel Formulation Approaches in the Design Strategy, Development and Evaluation of Oral Controlled Release Drug Delivery Systems.

Scientific contributions 
He developed RapiDiss Wafer Technology as an innovative way to provide effective anti-retroviral (ARV) drug therapy to children afflicted with HIV/AIDS. He developed the world's fastest dissolving matrix for the onset of rapid drug action in the human body, a neural device for therapeutic intervention in spinal cord injury and novel wound healing technologies. He also came up with his own molecular modelling paradigms called PEiGOR Theory - Pillay's Electro-influenced Geometrical Organization-Reorganization. This theory was published in the International Journal of Pharmaceutics.

Fellowship and membership 
He was a elected a Fellow of the Academy of Science of South Africa in 2012. He was also a member of the American Chemical Society, the American Association of Pharmaceutical Scientists, New York Academy of Sciences, the Academy of Pharmaceutical Sciences of South Africa , and The Biomaterials Network.

Awards and honours 
He was a beneficiary of National Research Foundation (NRF) Awards.

Death 
Pillay died on 24 July 2020 after a lengthy illness. He left behind a wife and a daughter.

References 

University of Durban-Westville alumni
Pharmacologists
1970 births
2020 deaths
Fellows of the African Academy of Sciences